John Wilson (1870 – after 1900), sometimes known as Jack Wilson, was a Scottish professional footballer who played in the Scottish League for St Bernard's as an outside right. He played much of his subsequent career as a centre half or right back in the Football League and the Southern League for Lincoln City, Swindon Town, New Brompton and Manchester City.

Career statistics

References

1870 births
Year of death missing
People from Ayrshire
Scottish footballers
St Bernard's F.C. players
Gillingham F.C. players
Lincoln City F.C. players
Manchester City F.C. players
Birmingham City F.C. players
Swindon Town F.C. players
English Football League players
Southern Football League players
Place of death missing
Association football utility players
Association football outside forwards
Association football wing halves
Association football fullbacks
Scottish Football League representative players

Beith F.C. players
Barnsley F.C. players